Kaštela is a town in Split-Dalmatia County. The town is an agglomeration of seven individual settlements which are administered as a single municipality with populations individually ranging from 3,000 to 7,000 residents. The town is located northwest of the city of Split, west of Solin and east of Trogir, on the central Dalmatian coast. With a total population of 37,794  census, it is the 14th largest town in the country.

Geography

Settlements 
The Town of Kaštela consists of following settlements (populations parenthesised):
Kaštel Gomilica (4,699)
Kaštel Kambelovac (5,051)
Kaštel Lukšić (5,221)
Kaštel Novi (6,507)
Kaštel Stari (6,950)
Kaštel Sućurac (6,544)
Kaštel Štafilić (2,822)

Overview

It is divided into Gornja (upper) and Donja Kaštela (lower), and it consists of seven old and two relatively new settlements. The Kaštela region with its Mediterranean tone, picturesque landscape and unique composition of natural environment attracted people since prehistoric times. From ancient Greek sailors, Roman patricians, Croatian kings, rulers, Venetian royals to the present sun and sea lovers, as well as mysterious legacies from the past.

Once an ancient Greek port, a stopover point for Roman veterans and a summer place for Croatian kings is today a tourist resort, carrying the same name. Along its long sandy beach there are terraces and viewpoints, tennis and other sports grounds, surrounded by greenery of pine and tamaris trees.

The Jadro River (the original water supply for the ancient city of Diocletian's Palace) flows through the town of Solin and provides water supply to both Split and Kaštela. Contemporary studies indicate favourable water quality levels of the river near the headwaters at Jadro Spring. Certain other studies of hydrology and sedimentation have been conducted in this area.

Population

Economy
The industrial zone is developed, and there is an aluminium extraction facility in the vicinity of Kaštel Sućurac and the Split Airport is located in Kaštel Štafilić. Present area of Kaštela and its inland in the vicinity of ancient Salona were inhabited very early (the finds from the Roman and Old Croatian period).

Twin towns
Kaštela is twinned with: 
  Bardejov, Slovakia,
  Hradec Králové, Czech Republic,
  Kiseljak and Kupres, Bosnia and Herzegovina,
  Pszczyna, Poland,
  Lindlar, Germany,
  Sušice, Czech Republic,
  Zaprešić, Croatia, and 
  Yountville, United States.

See also
 Dalmatia
 Split Airport

References

External links

Cities and towns in Croatia
Populated places in Split-Dalmatia County
Populated coastal places in Croatia